William Pomeroy Crawford Greene (28 June 1884 – 10 May 1959) was an Australian-born English Conservative Party politician.

Early life 
Greene was born on 28 June 1884 at his parents' home Iandra in Greenethorpe, Weddin Shire, New South Wales, Australia, the son of George Henry Greene and his wife Ellen.

Greene registered a coat of arms in 1908 with the Ulster King of Arms in Dublin. This coat of arms had been "borne and used by his family" for some time and can be described as on a blue shield three golden stags inside a gold border. Above the shield emerging from a gold coronet the head of a stag also gold, marked with a green shamrock on the neck. The Lain motto was "Nec timeo nec sperno" ("I neither fear nor despise").

Politics 
At the 1923 general election, he was elected as Member of Parliament (MP) for Worcester. He held the seat until he retired from politics at the 1945 election.

In 1933, he flew with Allen Bathurst, Lord Apsley from England to Australia.

Later life 
Greene died on 10 May 1959 in The London Clinic. His estate was valued at £142,402. He was buried with his parents and brother in their private cemetery at their home Iandra in Australia.

Arms

References

External links 
 
 Who's Who in Australia 1950: entry for Greene, William Pomeroy Crawford

1884 births
1959 deaths
Conservative Party (UK) MPs for English constituencies
Members of the Parliament of the United Kingdom for Worcester
UK MPs 1923–1924
UK MPs 1924–1929
UK MPs 1929–1931
UK MPs 1931–1935
UK MPs 1935–1945